The 2003 Governor General's Awards for Literary Merit: Finalists in 14 categories (70 books) were announced October 20, the four children's literature winners announced and presented November 10, other winners announced and presented November 12. Each winner received a cheque for $15,000.

The separate announcement and presentation of children's literature awards – four, recognizing text and illustration in English- and French-language books – was a novelty in 2003 (continued for at least a few years). The event at Rideau Hall, the Governor General's residence in Ottawa, was scheduled to begin at 10:00 on a Monday morning. "Children from across the National Capital Region will be invited to attend the event, which will also include readings and workshops related to children's literature."

English-language finalists

Fiction
Douglas Glover, Elle
Margaret Atwood, Oryx and Crake
Elizabeth Hay, Garbo Laughs
Jean McNeil, Private View
Edeet Ravel, Ten Thousand Lovers

Poetry
Tim Lilburn, Kill-site
Tim Bowling, The Witness Ghost
Evan Jones, Nothing Fell Today But Rain
Anne Simpson, Loop
Tom Wayman, My Father's Cup

Drama
Vern Thiessen, Einstein's Gift
Marie Clements, Burning Vision
Brian Drader, Prok
Sunil Kuruvilla, Rice Boy
Michael MacLennan, Last Romantics

Non-fiction
Margaret MacMillan, Paris 1919: Six Months That Changed the World
Andrew Clark, A Keen Soldier: The Execution of Second World War Private Harold Pringle
Andrew Cohen, While Canada Slept: How We Lost Our Place in the World
Maggie de Vries, Vancouver, for Missing Sarah: A Vancouver Woman Remembers Her Vanished Sister
Ross King, Michelangelo and the Pope's Ceiling

Children's literature (text)
Glen Huser, Stitches
Sarah Ellis, The Several Lives of Orphan Jack
Barbara Haworth-Attard, Theories of Relativity
Kevin Major, Ann and Seamus
Judd Palmer, The Maestro

Children's literature (illustration)
Allen Sapp, The Song Within My Heart
Nicolas Debon, Four Pictures by Emily Carr
Rob Gonsalves, Imagine a Night
Barbara Reid, The Subway Mouse
Ludmila Zeman, Sindbad's Secret: From the Tales of the Thousand and One Nights

French-to-English translation
Jane Brierley, Memoirs of a Less Travelled Road: A Historian's Life
Patricia Claxton, A Sunday at the Pool in Kigali
Jo-Anne Elder, Tales from Dog Island: St. Pierre et Miquelon
David Homel and Fred A. Reed, The Heart Is an Involuntary Muscle
Susan Ouriou, Necessary Betrayals

French-language finalists

Fiction
Élise Turcotte, 
Jean-François Chassay, 
Marie Gagnier, 
Gaétan Soucy, Music-Hall!
Larry Tremblay,

Poetry
Pierre Nepveu, 
Nicole Brossard, 
Carle Coppens, 
Benoît Jutras, 
Louis-Jean Thibault,

Drama
Jean-Rock Gaudreault, 
François Archambault, 
François Létourneau, Cheech
Wajdi Mouawad, Incendies
Jean-Pierre Ronfard,

Non-fiction
Thierry Hentsch, 
Michel Morin, 
Louise Prescott, 
François Ricard, 
Régine Robin,

Children's literature (text)
Danielle Simard, J'ai vendu ma soeur
Mélissa Anctil, Gigi
Roger Des Roches, Marie Quatdoigts
Laurent Grimon, Le chevalier des Arbres
Paul Chanel Malenfant, Si tu allais quelque part

Children's literature (illustration)
Virginie Egger, Recette d'éléphant à la sauce vieux pneu
Geneviève Côté, Le Premier Printemps du monde
Gérard DuBois, Le piano muet
Stéphane Jorisch, Thésée et le Minotaure
Stéphane Poulin, Annabel et la Bête

English-to-French translation
Agnès Guitard, Un amour de Salomé
Yolande Amzallag, Le canari éthique: science, société et esprit humain
Paule Noyart, L'Or bleu: l'eau, nouvel enjeu stratégique et commercial
Hélène Paré, L'histoire spectacle: le cas du tricentenaire de Québec
Lori Saint-Martin and Paul Gagné, L'analyste

References

Governor General's Awards
Governor General's Awards
Governor General's Awards